Kenneth Whipple Bilby (October 7, 1918 – August 1, 1997) was a recipient of the Legion of Honour, an executive vice president of RCA, and the author of The General, a book on David Sarnoff's role in the creation of RCA and television.

Biography
He was born on October 7, 1918 in Salt Lake City, Utah to Ralph Willard Bilby and Marguerite Mansfield. He had a brother, Richard Bilby, who became a judge on the United States District Court for the District of Arizona.

He joined the Army on October 15, 1941. During World War II, he served with the 30th Infantry Division in France and Germany, and was awarded The Legion of Honor, the Bronze Star and the Silver Star. He became a lieutenant colonel. After the World War, he covered the 1948 Arab–Israeli War and authored the book: New Star in the Near East.

He married Helen Owen Lehman in 1948. When he retired from RCA he was appointed Executive in Residence at Harvard Business School.

Books
New Star in the Near East, Doubleday
The General: David Sarnoff and the rise of the Communications Industry (1986), Harper and Row,

References

1918 births
1997 deaths
20th-century American businesspeople
20th-century American non-fiction writers
Businesspeople from Salt Lake City
Writers from Salt Lake City
Recipients of the Legion of Honour
Harvard Business School faculty
Writers from Dallas
Writers from Tucson, Arizona
People from Connecticut
American telecommunications industry businesspeople
Recipients of the Silver Star
Deaths from leukemia
United States Army personnel of World War II
Deaths from cancer in Texas
United States Army officers
Military personnel from Texas
RCA people